Steven Findlay (born 22 September 1986, in  Motherwell, Scotland) is a Scotland Club XV international rugby union player who plays for Glasgow Hawks at the Loosehead Prop position. In the 2015-16 season he had a short term professional deal with Glasgow Warriors. He previously played for Dalziel Rugby Club and Eastern Suburbs in Australia.

Amateur career

Findlay started playing amateur rugby with Dalziel Rugby Club in 2004. He played with them until 2011 appearing 97 times for the 1st XV and scoring 45 points (nine tries).

Moving to the Glasgow Hawks for the season 2011–12, Findlay made 22 appearances for the club in season 2014–15.

The Glasgow Warriors professional contract in 2015 allowed Findlay to play at Glasgow Hawks when not involved with the Warriors team.

On 30 March 2016 it was announced that Findlay would move to New South Wales, Australia to play for Eastern Suburbs for a season playing in the Shute Shield.

After the Australian rugby season finished, Findlay returned to play for Glasgow Hawks.

Professional career

He was called up to the Glasgow Warriors 'A' squad for a derby match against an Edinburgh 'A' side in September 2014.

On 17 July 2015 it was announced that Findlay had secured a short term professional contract with Glasgow Warriors to provide depth and competition for places during the 2015 World Cup when the Warriors will lose a host of their top stars on Scotland duty.

International career

Findlay has been called up for the Scotland ClubXV squad.

External links 
Four players signed ahead of new campaign
Glasgow Hawks duo in Scotland club call-up

References 

1986 births
Living people
Scottish rugby union players
Glasgow Hawks players
Dalziel RFC players
Glasgow Warriors players
Eastern Suburbs players
Rugby union players from Motherwell
Scotland Club XV international rugby union players
Rugby union props